The following people, military units, and groups have received the honorary freedom of Stoke-on-Trent.

Individuals
 Sir Stanley Matthews : 25 July 1963.
 George Stevenson: 2006.
 Robbie Williams: 2 July 2014.
 Neil Baldwin : 16 October 2014.
 Gordon Banks : 16 October 2014.

Military units
 The Queen's Royal Lancers: 4 December 2013.

Organizations and groups
 Stoke City Football Club: 4 December 2013.

References

Stoke-on-Trent
Stoke-on-Trent